Hourglass Buttress is a rock buttress, rising to ,  west of Beard Peak in the La Gorce Mountains, Queen Maud Mountains, Antarctica. It was mapped by the United States Geological Survey from surveys and U.S. Navy aerial photographs, 1960–64, and geologically mapped by a United States Antarctic Research Program – Arizona State University geological party, 1980–81. The name derives from a long snow chute up the face of the buttress.

References

Ridges of Marie Byrd Land